Henry Liddell was a dean.

Henry Liddell may also refer to:

Henry Liddell (priest) (1787-1872), father of the dean
Henry Liddell, 1st Baron Ravensworth (1708-1784), Member of Parliament for Morpeth

See also
Harry Liddell (1866-1931), politician